A jack-in-the-box is a children's toy dating back to the 16th century.

Jack in the Box or Jack-in-the-Box may also refer to:

Arts, entertainment, and media
 Jack in the Box, an American restaurant chain
 Jack in the Box, 2022 studio album by South Korean rapper J-Hope
 Jack in the Box, a work by Erik Satie for a pantomime-ballet 
 "Jack in the Box", a 1971 song by Clodagh Rodgers
 Jack-in-the-Box (Astro City), a character in Astro City, published by WildStorm comics
 Jack-in-the-Box (real name Jack Mead), a mutant superhero in Marvel Comics publications
 "Jack-in-the-Box", a 1947 short story by Ray Bradbury
 "Jack in the Box", a 1977 song by The Moments

Other uses
 Jack Box, the mascot for the Jack in the Box restaurant
 Jack-in-the-box effect, an armored vehicle's turret becoming displaced after a sympathetic detonation

See also
 Jackinabox, a 2005 album by Turin Brakes